Philippe Bourgois (born 1956) is professor of anthropology and director of the Center for Social Medicine and Humanities in the Department of Psychiatry at the University of California at Los Angeles. He was the founding chair of the Department of Anthropology, History and Social Medicine at the University of California, San Francisco (1998–2003) and was the Richard Perry University Professor at the University of Pennsylvania (2007–2016).

Biography
A student of Eric Wolf and influenced by the work of French social theorists Pierre Bourdieu and Michel Foucault, he is considered an important proponent of neo-Marxist theory and of critical medical anthropology.

His most recent book Righteous Dopefiend was co-authored with Jeff Schonberg and was published in June, 2009 by the University of California Press in their “Public Anthropology” series. The book won the 2010 Anthony Leeds Prize for Urban Anthropology. Bourgois' previous book was based on five years living with his family next to a crack house in East Harlem during the mid-1980s through the early 1990s: In Search of Respect: Selling Crack in El Barrio. It won the 1996 C. Wright Mills Award and the 1997 Margaret Mead Award among others. Many of his books and articles have been translated for foreign publication. He has also conducted research in Central America on ethnicity and social unrest and is the author of Ethnicity at Work: Divided Labor on a Central American Banana Plantation (1989) which was based on two years of living in the workers' barracks of a Chiquita Brands banana plantation spanning the borders of Costa Rica and Panama.

Bourgois received a bachelor's degree in social studies from Harvard College in 1978. He was awarded a master's degree in development economics (1980) and a Ph.D. in anthropology (1985) from Stanford University. He spent a year as a postdoctoral fellow at the École Normale Supérieure in Paris in 1985–1986.

In graduate school he worked for the Agrarian Reform ministry in Nicaragua (1980) during the Sandinista revolution and was a human rights activist on Capitol Hill advocating against military aid to the government of El Salvador in 1982.  His first academic job was as assistant professor in the Anthropology Department at Washington University in St. Louis (1986–1988) followed by 10 years at San Francisco State University (1988–1998) and a decade at the University of California, San Francisco. He has also been a Fulbright Research professor in Costa Rica (1993–1994) and a visiting scholar at the Russel Sage Foundation (1990–1991), the Institute for Advanced Study in Princeton (2003–2004), and the School for Advanced Research in Santa Fe (2012–2013). He received the Guggenheim Foundation prize in 2013.

Publications
In addition to his three ethnographies Bourgois has published five edited volumes, including Violence in War and Peace (2004 Blackwell), co-edited with Nancy Scheper-Hughes and most recently, "Violence at the Urban Margins" (2015 Oxford), co-edited with Javier Auyero and Nancy Scheper-Hughes. He published an ethnographic study of East Harlem crack dealers, In Search of Respect: Selling Crack in East Harlem (Cambridge University Press. 1995). Bourgois is also the author of over 150 academic and popular press articles addressing segregation in the U.S. inner city, homelessness, gender violence, immigration and labor conflict, substance abuse, HIV, and intimate violence. He also published an article on his father's escape from Auschwitz ("Missing the Holocaust").

In Search of Respect: Selling Crack in El Barrio

Bourgois' ethnographic research of the crack dealers and their families revealed the structural barriers that marginalized the minority group of Puerto Ricans, and how their violent street culture further isolated them from mainstream society.

The violent street culture was necessary for them to gain respect within their own marginalized groups. Many of the drug dealers did, in fact, want to enter the legal workforce, however, they were often subject to prejudice and with their lack of education and gap in employment history when they were selling drugs, they were often rejected or could only get jobs at minimum wage. Many subsequently returned to the drug trade.

Righteous Dopefiend  
Opioid addiction in San Francisco, California is explored by Bourgois and photographer Jeff Schonberg in their 2009 photo-ethnography Righteous Dopefiend wherein the two observe, photograph, and critically analyze a group of homeless heroin addicts from November 1994 through December 2006 (Bourgois 4). 

The ethnography takes a humanistic approach to counter action against opioid addiction in the California region by attempting to redefine the perception of opioid addiction and humanize the experiences of addicts by illustrating the presence of inequality, violence, racism, suffering, and complex power relations within the San Francisco drug scene. Bourgois writes: “The central goal of this photo-ethnography… is to clarify the relationship between large-scale power forces and intimate ways of being in order to explain why the United States, the wealthiest nation in the world, has emerged as a pressure cooker for producing destitute addicts embroiled in everyday violence” (Bourgois 5).

References

 McGee, R.J. and R.L. Warms, Anthropological Theory: An Introductory History. McGraw Hill, Boston, 2004.
Conniff, Michael L. Review of Ethnicity at Work: Divided Labor on a Central American Banana Plantation.  The American Historical Review, Vol. 96, No. 1 (Feb., 1991), pp. 297–298.
Bowen, Paulle, 2003 “Philippe Bourgois in Amsterdam: An Interview.”  Amsterdams Sociologisch Tijdschrift 30:4:544-574.

External links

Bourgois' webpage
Bourgois at University of Pennsylvania

1956 births
Living people
American anthropologists
Harvard College alumni
Stanford University alumni
Washington University in St. Louis faculty
University of Pennsylvania faculty
San Francisco State University faculty
University of California, San Francisco faculty
École Normale Supérieure alumni
American people of French descent